Senecio lamarckianus, the bois de chèvre, is a species of flowering plant in the aster family and a member of the genus Senecio. It is endemic to the island of Mauritius and is threatened by habitat loss.

S. lamarckianus is named after the French philosopher, botanist and zoologist Jean-Baptiste Pierre Antoine de Monet, Chevalier de Lamarck.

Description

Leaves and stems:
The stalk and branches are densely covered with white hairs. Oblong leather-like leaves are silvery greenish colored, 
Pointed at the tips and slender at the base; serrated, more so at the tips, mostly hairless on the tops and densely hairy underneath.

Flowers:
Numerous flower heads which cluster into a flat top, each on its own flower stalk; center flower heads tending to open first. Inflorescence is completely covered in white hairs and appears in groups of seven.

Fruits:

Distribution
Endemic to Mauritius, now very rare, it is found in dry mountainous regions around the summit peaks of the island. Localities: Mondrain, Pieter Both Mountain, Gubbies, Piton du Fouge Ridge Forest, crests above Port Louis, most of them in Piton du Fouge. There is a chance there are more individuals in more remote areas.

References

lamarckianus
Endemic flora of Mauritius
Critically endangered plants
Taxonomy articles created by Polbot